Sônia Maria Campos Braga (born 8 June 1950) is a Brazilian actress. She is known in the English-speaking world for her Golden Globe Award–nominated performances in Kiss of the Spider Woman (1985) and Moon over Parador (1988). She also received a BAFTA Award nomination in 1981 for Dona Flor and Her Two Husbands (first released in 1976). For the 1994 television film The Burning Season, she was nominated for an Emmy Award and a third Golden Globe Award. Her other television and film credits include The Cosby Show (1986), Sex and the City (2001), American Family (2002), Alias (2005), Aquarius (2016), Bacurau (2019), and Fatima (2020). In 2020, The New York Times ranked her #24 in its list of the 25 Greatest Actors of the 21st Century.

Early life
Sônia Braga was born on June 8, 1950, daughter of Hélio Fernando Ferraz Braga and Maria Braga Jaci Campos, a costume designer from Maringá. Sônia's siblings are Júlio, Ana, Hélio and Maria. Sônia is the aunt of Alice Braga, an actress. Her parents and her four siblings moved to Curitiba and then to Campinas, São Paulo. When Braga was 8 years old, her father died, and she attended a convent school in the city of São Paulo. In her teens, she took a job as a receptionist and typist at Buffet Torres, a wedding reception and event catering company in the city of São Paulo.

Career
Sônia's brother, Hélio, presented the TV Tupi children's show, Jardim Encantado. At age 14, Braga was invited by director Vicente Sesso to play small roles in children's programs and teleteatros on TV Tupi, including Jardim Encantado. Sônia then joined a theater group in Santo André, in the ABC region. At 17, she debuted in the play George Dandin in Santo André. 

In 1968, she was cast in the first Brazilian production of  the musical Hair. Sônia was, at first, turned down by director , but at the insistence of producer/actor , she joined Antônio Fagundes, Ney Latorraca, and the rest of the cast. Despite Institutional Act No. 5 being enacted by the dictatorship in Brazil, the musical ran for 3 years. In 1977, Caetano Veloso wrote the song Tigresa in tribute to her: “She tells me she was an actress and worked on Hair. With some men she was happy, with others she was a woman”...

In 1968, Braga was in the film O Bandido da Luz Vermelha. In 1969, she was invited to perform in A Menina do Veleiro Azul, a soap opera produced by TV Excelsior, but the network closed before the soap opera aired. In 1970, Braga was invited to join the cast of Irmãos Coragem, a soap opera written by Janete Clair, which aired on Rede Globo. Also in the early '70s, she appeared in supporting roles in the films  and Cléo e Daniel.  Despite the success on stage and acting in soap operas, it was in the children's television series, Vila Sésamo, broadcast in 1972, that Braga became a household name. 

In 1975, Braga starred in the telenovela Gabriela, an adaptation of Jorge Amado's novel Gabriela, Clove and Cinnamon. Directed by Walter Avancini, the soap opera was a great national and international success, establishing Sonia Braga as a sex symbol. Braga returned to embody another Jorge Amado character, starring in the 1976 film Dona Flor and Her Two Husbands directed by Bruno Barreto, alongside José Wilker and Mauro Mendonça. The romantic comedy was a box office hit in Brazilian cinemas and also received major recognition internationally. In 1983, she starred in the film Gabriela, alongside Marcello Mastroianni.

In 1976, Braga participated in the cast of Saramandaia. The following year she starred in Espelho Mágico as Cynthia Levy. One of the highlights of the soundtrack of the soap opera is the cover version that Gal Costa recorded of Tigresa, music that Caetano Veloso composed in honor of Braga. In the late 1970s, Braga gave life to another renowned character in Brazilian television, Julia Matos in Dancin' Days (1978). In the storyline, Braga played an ex-convict who gets out of prison ready to win back the love of her daughter, played by Gloria Pires. In 1979, Sonia Braga ventured into children's theater in the play No País dos Prequetés. The following year she returned to television in the telenovela Chega Mais alongside Tony Ramos.

In the early 1980s, Braga, who had already made films like Lady on the Bus (1978), decided to devote herself exclusively to the movies. In 1981, she starred in Eu Te Amo directed by Arnaldo Jabor, and won the best actress award at the Gramado Film Festival. She starred in the movie Kiss of the Spider Woman (1985) alongside William Hurt and Raul Julia. Her role led to a Golden Globe nomination for best supporting actress and its success led to her international work. She decided to leave Brazil for a career in the United States, where she lived for 14 years. In 2003, she obtained American citizenship.

Braga was the first Brazilian to present a category at the Oscars. She was announced by Goldie Hawn as one of the most glamorous actresses in the world, before appearing with Michael Douglas, who announced the result of the best short film. Braga competed for many prestigious awards in the United States. For her performance in The Burning Season (1994) she was nominated for the third time for the Golden Globe for best supporting actress. In 1995, she was nominated for an Emmy Award for Best Supporting Actress in a Miniseries or a Movie for The Burning Season, but lost to Shirley Knight. The film details the life of Brazilian activist Chico Mendes. In 1996, she won the Lone Star Film & Television Award for best supporting actress for her work in Streets of Laredo directed by Joseph Sargent. That same year, director Nicolas Roeg offered her the lead role in the film Two Deaths alongside Patrick Malahide. Braga also had the lead in Tieta of Agreste (1996), directed by Carlos Diegues.

In 1999, after nearly 20 years away from Brazilian television, the actress made a cameo in the first 15 chapters of the soap opera Força de um Desejo (1999), by Gilberto Braga and Alcides Nogueira, in the role of Helena Silveira, mother of characters Fábio Assunção and Selton Mello. In 2001, she joined the cast of Memórias Póstumas directed by André Klotzel, based on The Posthumous Memoirs of Bras Cubas by Machado de Assis. For her performance in this film, she won the Kikito award for best supporting actress at the Gramado Film Festival.

In 2001 Braga appeared in Angel Eyes, a romantic drama film directed by Luis Mandoki and starring Jennifer Lopez. In 2002, she appeared in American Family, a PBS series created by Gregory Nava that follows the lives of a Latino family in Los Angeles.

In 2006, she returned to work in Globo's telenovela Páginas da Vida, playing sculptor Tônia. In 2010, she starred in the episode A Adultera da Urca, in the miniseries As Cariocas, and in 2011, made a cameo in the Tapas & Beijos series.

Braga had a recurring role as Lorraine Correia in the sixth season of the series Royal Pains. Braga's scenes were filmed on location in Mexico and her episodes were aired in August 2014.

In 2016, she appeared in Netflix's Marvel show Luke Cage as Rosario Dawson's mother.

Sonia Braga earned rave reviews for her film Aquarius when it premiered at the 2016 Cannes Film Festival. Braga plays a widow and retired music writer who lives in the titular apartment complex and refuses to leave when developers offer her a buy-out. Though the film did not earn an Oscar nomination for Braga, it did contend for Best Foreign Film at France's Cesar Awards and the Independent Spirit Awards.

Braga ranked in the top five in IndieWire's 2016 critics' poll for Best Actress. 
In 2020, The New York Times ranked her #24 in its list of the 25 Greatest Actors of the 21st Century.

Personal life
Braga was married twice: first to fellow actor Arduíno Colassanti from 1970 to 1976 and then to musician  from 1980 to 1988.

During the 1980s, Braga also had a relationship with actor Robert Redford. She then had a relationship with Pat Metheny.

Filmography

Film

Television

Awards and nominations

References

External links

 Sonia Braga at Yahoo! Movies

1950 births
Living people
People from Maringá
Brazilian film actresses
Brazilian television actresses
Brazilian emigrants to the United States
People from Roosevelt Island
American film actresses
American television actresses
Naturalized citizens of the United States
American people of Brazilian descent
20th-century Brazilian actresses
21st-century Brazilian actresses
20th-century American actresses
21st-century American actresses